Stay Human is the third studio release by Michael Franti & Spearhead.  Many of the tracks on this album are fictional radio segments focusing on the case of "Sister Fatima" who is executed later in the album for murder. At the album's end, new evidence reveals Sister Fatima was innocent, and Governor Franklin Shane, who authorized the execution in order to boost his re-election campaign, commits suicide. In the radio segments, Governor Shane is played by Woody Harrelson.

Track listing
"Oh My God" (Franti, Ramon Lazo) (5:07)
"Radio Segment" (0:53)
"Stay Human (All the Freaky People)" (Franti, Young) (4:27)
"Radio Segment" (0:59)
"Rock the Nation" (Franti, Young) (4:26)
"Sometimes" (Franti, Shul) (4:05)
"Radio Segment" (1:26)
"Do Ya Love" (Franti, Young) (4:50)
"Radio Segment" (1:18)
"Soulshine" (Franti) (3:58)
"Every Single Soul" (Franti, Ramon Lazo, Quintana, Shul, Young) (5:44)
"Radio Segment" (1:02)
"Love'll Set Me Free" (Franti, Shul, Young) (3:57)
"Thank You" (Franti, Ramon Lazo, Shul, Young) (4:55)
"Radio Segment" (2:30)
"We Don't Mind" (Franti, Ramon Lazo) (4:49)
"Radio Segment" (0:50)
"Speaking of Tongues" (Franti) (4:45)
"Radio Segment" (1:36)
"Listener Supported" (Franti, Marie Daulne) (4:38)
"Radio Segment" (0:44)
"Skin on the Drum" (Franti) (6:19)

Tracks 2, 4, 7, 9, 17, 21 are performed by Brother Soulshine and The Nubian Poetess
Tracks 12, 15, 19 are performed by Brother Soulshine

Personnel
Spearhead
Michael Franti: vocals, programming, guitars
Carl Young: bass, keys, flute, sax
Dave Shul: guitars
Roberto Quintana: drums, percussion

Additional musicians
Ramon Lazo: keyboards, Fender Rhodes
Mary Harris: background vocals
Zap Mama: vocals on "Listener Supported"
RadioActive: vocals (track 5)
Josh Klor: background vocals (track 13)
Caitlin Cornwall: background vocals (track 13)
Tanya Saw: vocals (track 20)
Al Marshal: drums (tracks 1, 5, 7, 11, & 13)
Troy Lampkins: DJ cuts (tracks 11 & 16)
Jay Lane: drums (track 16)
Victor Castro: Trombone
Gordon Ramos: saxophone
Bob Crawford: keyboards (track 10)

Charts

Certifications

References

Michael Franti albums
2001 albums
Six Degrees Records albums
Rap operas